Shane Curran (born 2000) is an Irish entrepreneur. He is the founder of Evervault, a technology company based in Dublin. He won the 53rd BT Young Scientist and Technology Exhibition in 2017 at the age of sixteen for his project entitled: “qCrypt: The quantum-secure, encrypted, data storage platform with multi-jurisdictional quorum sharing technology”, which provided a platform for long-term, secure data storage. In January 2018, Curran was named in the Forbes 30 Under 30 list.

Career

BT Young Scientist
Curran entered the 53rd BT Young Scientist and Technology Exhibition with his project entitled "qCrypt: The quantum-secure, encrypted, data storage platform with multijurisdictional quorum sharing technology". The project consisted of advancements in the field of post-quantum cryptography. Quantum computers are expected to render existing cryptography schemes obsolete once they come into existence. Curran's research investigated different ways to approach constructing a solution to the issue. On 13 January 2017 he was announced the BT Young Scientist and Technologist of the Year 2017 by Minister for Education and Skills, Mr. Richard Bruton, T.D and Shay Walsh, CEO, BT Ireland. He went on to represent Ireland at the 29th European Union Contest for Young Scientists which took place in Tallinn, Estonia in September 2017.

Evervault
In 2019, Curran founded Evervault, which builds encryption infrastructure for developers. The company is headquartered in Dublin, Ireland and has received backing from Sequoia Capital and Kleiner Perkins.

References

External links
 Personal Website

Young Scientist and Technology Exhibition
2000 births
21st-century Irish people
Living people
Irish computer scientists
Businesspeople from Dublin (city)